is a former Japanese football player.

Club statistics

References

External links

1981 births
Living people
Doshisha University alumni
Association football people from Kyoto Prefecture
Japanese footballers
J1 League players
J2 League players
Japan Football League players
Kyoto Sanga FC players
Kataller Toyama players
Thespakusatsu Gunma players
Universiade medalists in football
Universiade gold medalists for Japan
Association football goalkeepers